Bombay 2: Electric Vindaloo is a 2001 album showcasing remixed and original songs from movie soundtrack composing duo Kalyanji–Anandji.  This album is a sequel to Bombay the Hard Way: Guns, Cars and Sitars released on Motel Records in 1998. While Bombay the Hard Way: Guns, Cars and Sitars centered around '70s era Bollywood music, Bombay 2: Electric Vindaloo "leaps forward into the electro-‘80s, when Bollywood soundtracks moved on from funk to the kind of drum machine-driven, synthesizer heavy sound"

Track listing
"Ram Balram" Remix – Ursula 1000 4:49
"Bionic Kakaan" Remix – DJ Me DJ You 3:17
"Theme From Twin Sheiks 1:07
"Third World Lover" Remix – Dynomite D, Kid Koala 5:34
"Rah-keet" 2:42
"Hydrolik Carpet Ride" Remix – Mix Master Mike 4:20
"Bollywood B-boy Battle" 2:56
"Mr.natwarlal"  Remix – DJ Me DJ You 2:59
"Basmati Beatdown" Remix – Dynomite D 6:20
"T.J. Hookah"	1:02
"Superstar Sam " 1:14
"Disco Raj" Remix – DJ Me DJ You 4:17
"Sexy Mother Fakir" 2:38
"Inspector Jay's Big Score" Remix – Spic-Beatz & Pak-Man 5:58
"Electric Vindaloo" Remix – Steinski 4:19
"Dil Street Blues" 2:13
"Chakra Khan" 3:55

References

Hip hop soundtracks
2001 soundtrack albums